Mira Datta Gupta (5 October 1907 – 18 January 1983) was a freedom fighter, social worker, educationist, politician and activist on women's issues in Calcutta, India. She was a Member of the Legislative Assembly (MLA) in Bengal and then West Bengal for twenty years from 1937 to 1957, firstly representing Women's constituency from 1937 to 1952, and then Bhowanipore from 1952 to 1957. She was the first MLA from Bhowanipore.

Political career

She was a member of the Indian Congress Party between 1937 and 1946. She was elected four times (1937, 1942, 1946 and 1951) as Member of the State Legislative Assembly of Bengal, later renamed West Bengal. She was offered the post of Deputy Minister in the Cabinet of 1952 of the then Chief Minister, Bidhan Chandra Roy, which she declined.

Mira's reputation grew with her increasing involvement in the revolutionary movement. She was associated with Indian revolutionary groups, such as Anushilan, Jugantar and Bengal Volunteers. As a member of Bengal Volunteers she was the editor of the women's section of its magazine – Benu. While, initially she was put in charge of the organisation's South Calcutta Women's group, she later moved into a low profile role, choosing to work for India's independence secretly. In those days she used to donate her entire salary towards India's freedom movement to her party Bengal Volunteers. 

Around this time she also provided a channel for information between the revolutionaries who had to remain under cover and other members of the party. She participated in one of the important meetings of Bengal Volunteers held at Baranagar near Kolkata to discuss the group's activities in Midnapore and other parts of the state. From 1933, the police grew suspicious of her activities and she was placed under constant surveillance. In 1938, many party members such as Bhavani Bhattacharya and Ujjala Mazumdar were arrested in connection with the shooting of Governor John Anderson in Darjeeling district. Mira was cross-examined by the police for many hours in connection with this case. At this stage her father sent her away from Calcutta for two years to ensure her personal safety. She was very actively involved in fund raising activities during the Quit India Movement of 1942. In 1946, she was jailed for her nationalist activities. After her released from prison she became one of the first members of Netaji Subhas Chandra Bose's Forward Bloc.

She had a devoted following in the Ballygunge Constituency, all along the southeastern environs of the city, and was known for her social commitment. During the devastating Bengal Famine of 1943, she, along with co-Congress workers played a leading role in organising relief for famine victims.

Later, after independence, her many activities included relief activities for those affected by famines, floods, and also the rehabilitation of the homeless and economically weaker women.

Post-retirement

In her post-retirement years, she served as an honorary justice of peace in the juvenile court in Kolkata and was a member of the Board of Film Censors in West Bengal. In 1958 she joined the Indian goodwill mission to China and later visited Berlin, Copenhagen and Moscow to attend developmental, educational and women's conferences. She was also a member of the Calcutta University Senate and the West Bengal Board of Secondary Education. She also contributed to the setting up of Patha Bhavan, Kolkata, a school named after the university school in Santiniketan.

Death
She died of pneumonia on 18 January 1983, at the age of 76.

References

1907 births
1983 deaths
All India Forward Bloc politicians
Indian feminists
Members of the West Bengal Legislative Assembly
Bethune College alumni
University of Calcutta alumni
Academic staff of the University of Calcutta
Social workers
Women in West Bengal politics
20th-century Indian educational theorists
Indian women educational theorists
Women scientists from West Bengal
Politicians from Kolkata
Indian National Congress politicians from West Bengal
Women Indian independence activists
20th-century Indian women politicians
20th-century Indian politicians
Scholars from Kolkata
Women educators from West Bengal
Social workers from West Bengal
20th-century women educators